Jainism is an Indian religion which is traditionally believed to be propagated by twenty-four spiritual teachers known as tirthankara. Broadly, Jainism is divided into two major schools of thought, Digambara and Svetambara. These are further divided into different sub-sects and traditions. While there are differences in practices, the core philosophy and main principles of each sect is the same.

Schism

Traditionally, the original doctrine of Jainism was contained in scriptures called Purva. There were fourteen Purva. These are believed to have originated from Rishabhanatha, the first tirthankara. There was a twelve-year famine around fourth century BCE. At that time, Chandragupta Maurya was the ruler of Magadha and Bhadrabahu was the head of Jain community. Bhadrabahu went south to Karnataka with his adherents and Sthulabhadra, another Jain leader remained behind. During this time the knowledge of the doctrine was getting lost. A council was formed at Pataliputra where eleven scriptures called Angas were compiled and the remnant of fourteen purvas were written down in 12th Anga, Ditthivaya by the adherents of Sthulbhadra. When followers of Bhadrabahu returned, there was a dispute between them regarding the authenticity of the Angas. Also, those who stayed at Magadha started wearing white clothes which was unacceptable to the other who remain naked. This is how the Digambara and Svetambara sect came about. The Digambara being the naked ones where as Svetambara being the white clothed. According to Digambara, the purvas and the angas were lost. In course of time, the cannons of Svetambara were also getting lost. About 980 to 993 years after the Nirvana of Mahavira, a Vallabhi council was held at Vallabhi (now in Gujarat). This was headed by Devardhi Ksamashramana. It was found that the 12th Anga, the Ditthivaya, was lost too. The other Angas were written down. This is a traditional account of schism. According to Svetambara, there were eight schisms (Nihvana).

According to Digambara tradition, Ganadhara knew fourteen Purva and eleven Anga. Knowledge of Purva was lost around 436 years after Mahavira and Anga were lost around 683 years after Mahavira. The texts which do not belong to Anga are called Angabahyas. There were fourteen Angabahyas. The first four Angabahyas, Samayika, Chaturvimasvika, Vandana and Pratikramana corresponds to sections of second Mulasutra of Svetambara. The only texts of angabahyas which occurs in Svetambara texts are Dasavaikalika, Uttaradhyayana and Kalpavyavahara.

Early Jain images from Mathura depict Digambara iconography until late fifth century A.D. where Svetambara iconography starts appearing.

Differences
Other than rejecting or accepting different ancient Jain texts, Digambaras and Śvētāmbara differ in other significant ways such as:
 Śvētāmbaras trace their practices and dress code to the teachings of Parshvanatha, the 23rd tirthankara, which they believe taught only Four restraints (a claim, scholars say are confirmed by the ancient Buddhist texts that discuss Jain monastic life). Mahāvīra taught Five vows, which Digambara follow. The Digambara sect disagrees with the Śvētāmbara interpretations, and reject the theory of difference in Parshvanatha and Mahāvīra's teachings.
 Digambaras believe that both Parshvanatha and Mahāvīra remained unmarried, whereas Śvētāmbara believe the 23rd and 24th did indeed marry. According to the Śvētāmbara version, Parshva married Prabhavati, and Mahāvīra married Yashoda who bore him a daughter named Priyadarshana. The two sects also differ on the origin of Trishala, Mahāvīra's mother, as well as the details of Tirthankara's biographies such as how many auspicious dreams their mothers had when they were in the wombs.
 Digambara believe Rishabha, Vasupujya and Neminatha were the three tirthankaras who reached omniscience while in sitting posture and other tirthankaras were in standing ascetic posture. In contrast, Śvētāmbaras believe it was Rishabha, Nemi and Mahāvīra who were the three in sitting posture.
 Digambara iconography are plain, Śvētāmbara icons are decorated and colored to be more lifelike.
 According to Śvētāmbara Jain texts, from Kalpasūtras onwards, its monastic community has had more sadhvis than sadhus (female than male mendicants). In Tapa Gacch of the modern era, the ratio of sadhvis to sadhus (nuns to monks) is about 3.5 to 1. In contrast to Śvētāmbara, the Digambara sect monastic community has been predominantly male.
 In the Digambara tradition, a male human being is considered closest to the apex with the potential to achieve his soul's liberation from rebirths through asceticism. Women must gain karmic merit, to be reborn as man, and only then can they achieve spiritual liberation in the Digambara sect of Jainism. The Śvētāmbaras disagree with the Digambaras, believing that women can also achieve liberation from Saṃsāra through ascetic practices.
 The Śvētāmbaras state the 19th Tirthankara Māllīnātha was female.  However, Digambara reject this, and worship Mallinatha as a male.

Digambara

Digambara (sky-clad) is one of the two main sects of Jainism. This sect of Jainism rejects the authority of the Jain Agama compiled by Sthulabhadra. They believe that by the time of Dharasena, the twenty-third teacher after Gandhar Gautama, knowledge of only one Anga was there. This was about 683 years after the death of Mahavira. After Dharasena's pupils Acharya Puspadanta and Bhutabali. They wrote down the Shatkhandagama, one of the oldest scriptures of the digambara sect of Jainism. The other most revered and oldest scripture is the Kasay-pahuda. According to Digambara tradition, Mahavira, the last jaina tirthankara, never married. He renounced the world at the age of thirty after taking permission of his parents. The Digambara believe that after attaining enlightenment, Mahavira was free from human activities like hunger, thirst, and sleep. Digambara monks tradition do not wear any clothes. They carry only a broom made up of fallen peacock feathers and a water gourd. One of the most important scholar-monks of Digambara tradition was Acharya Kundakunda. He authored Prakrit texts such as Samayasara and Pravachansara. Samantabhadra and Siddhasena Divakara were other important monks of this tradition. The Digambara are present mainly in Southern India, Bundelkhand region (Madhya Pradesh, Rajasthan, Uttar Pradesh, etc. Digambar tradition is divided into two main orders Mula Sangh and the Kashtha Sangh. Among the prominent Digambara Acharyas today are Acharya Vidyasagar, Acharya Vardhman sagar, Acharya Vidyananda. 

Digambar tradition has two main monastic orders Mula Sangh and the Kashtha Sangh, both led by Bhattarakas.

Monastic orders
Mula Sangh is an ancient monastic order. Mula literally means root or original. The great Acharya Kundakunda is associated with Mula Sangh. The oldest known mention of Mula Sangh is from 430 CE.
Mula Sangh was divided into a few branches. According to Shrutavatara and Nitisar of Bhattaraka Indranandi, Acharya Arhadbali had organised a council of Jain monks, and had given names (gana or sangha) to different groups. The four major groups were Nandi Gana, Sena Gana, Deva Gana and Simha Gana. The Bhattarakas of Shravanabelagola, Mudabidri and Humbaj belongs to the Nandi Gana.

Kashtha Sangha was a monastic order once dominant in several regions of North and Western India. It is said to have originated from a town named Kashtha. The origin of Kashtha Sangha is often attributed to Lohacharya in several texts and inscriptions from Delhi region. The Kashtasangh Gurvavali identifies Lohacharya as the last person who knew Acharanga in the Digambara tradition, who lived until around 683-year after the nirvana of Lord Mahavira. Several Digambara orders in North India belonged to Kashtha Sangha. The Agrawal Jains were the major supporters of Kashtha Sangha. They were initiated by Lohacharya.  Kashta Sangha has several orders including Nanditat gachchha, Mathura Sangha, Bagada gachha and Lata-bagada gachha. The celebrated poet and pratishthacharya Raighu was a disciple of the Kashtha Sangh Bhattarakas of Gwalior. The rock carved Jain statues in the Gwalior Fort were mostly consecrated by the Kashtha Sangh Bhattarakas.

The Digambar Terapanth subsect was formed by Amra Bhaunsa Godika and his son Jodhraj Godika during 1664–1667 in opposition to the bhattakaras. The Bhattakara are the priestly class of Jainism who are responsible for maintaining libraries and other Jain institutions. The Terapanth sub-sect among the Digambara Jains emerged around the Jaipur (Sanganer, Amber and Jaipur region itself). Godika duo expressed opposition to the Bhattaraka Narendrakirti of Amber. Authors Daulatram Kasliwal and Pandit Todarmal) were associated with the Terapanth movement. They opposed worship of various minor gods and goddesses. Some Terapanthi practices, like not using flowers in worship, gradually spread throughout North India among the Digambaras. Bakhtaram in his "Mithyatva Khandan Natak" (1764) mentions that group that started it included thirteen individuals, who collectively built a new temple, thus giving it its name Tera-Panth (Thirteen Path). However, according to "Kavitta Terapanth kau" by a Chanda Kavi, the movement was named Tera Panth, because the founders disagreed with the Bhattaraka on thirteen points. A letter of 1692 from Tera Panthis at Kama to those at Sanganer mentions thirteen rituals that were rejected. These are mentioned in Buddhivilas (1770) of Bakhtaram. These are– authority of Bhattarakas, Use of flowers, cooked food or lamps, Abhisheka (panchamrita), consecration of images without supervision by the representatives of Bhattarakas, Puja while seated, Puja at night, Using drums in the temple and Worship of minor gods like dikpalas, shasan devis (Padmavati etc.) and Kshetrapal. The Digambara Jains who have continued to follow these practices are termed Bispanthi.

The Taran Panth was founded by Taran Svami in Bundelkhand in 1505. They do not believe in idol worshiping. Instead, the taranapantha community prays to the scriptures written by Taran Swami.
Taran Svami is also referred to as Taran Taran, the one who can help the swimmers to the other side, i.e. towards nirvana. A mystical account of his life, perhaps an autobiography, is given in Chadmastha Vani. The language in his fourteen books is a unique blend of Prakrit, Sanskrit and Apabhramsha. His language was perhaps influenced by his reading of the books of Acharya Kundakunda. Commentaries on six of the main texts composed by Taran Svami were written by Brahmacari Shitala Prasad in the 1930s. Commentaries on other texts have also been written recently. Osho, who was born into a Taranpanthi family, has included Shunya Svabhava and Siddhi Svabhava as among the books that influenced him most. The number of Taranpanthis is very small. Their shrines are called Chaityalaya (or sometimes Nisai/Nasia). At the altar (vimana) they have a book instead of an idol. The Taranpanthis were originally from six communities.

Svetambara

The Śvētāmbara (white-clad) is one of the two main sects of Jainism. Śvētāmbara is a term describing its ascetics' practice of wearing white clothes, which sets it apart from the Digambara whose ascetic practitioners go naked. Śvētāmbaras, unlike Digambaras, do not believe that ascetics must practice nudity. Svetambara monks usually wear white maintaining that nudism is no longer practical. Śvētāmbaras also believe that women are able to obtain moksha. Śvētāmbaras maintain that the 19th Tirthankara, Mallinath, was a woman. Some Śvētāmbara monks and nuns cover their mouth with a white cloth or muhapatti to practise ahimsa even when they talk. By doing so they minimise the possibility of inhaling small organisms. The Śvētāmbara tradition follows the lineage of Acharya Sthulibhadra Suri. The Kalpa Sūtra mentions some of the lineages in ancient times.

Both of the major Jain traditions evolved into sub-traditions over time. For example, the devotional worship traditions of Śvētāmbara are referred to as Murti-pujakas, those who live in and around Jain temples became Deravasi or Mandira-margi. Those who avoid temples and pursue their spirituality at a designated monastic meeting place came to be known as Sthānakavāsī.

Śvētāmbarins who are not Sthānakavāsins are called Murtipujaka (Idol-worshipers). Murtipujaka differ from Sthanakvasi Svetambaras in that their derasars contain idols of the Tirthankaras instead of empty rooms. They worship idols and have rituals for it. Murtipujaka monastics and worshippers do not use the muhapatti, a piece of cloth over the mouth, during prayers, whereas it is permanently worn by Sthanakvasi. The most prominent among the classical orders called Gacchas today are the Kharatara, Tapa and the Tristutik. Major reforms by Vijayanandsuri of the Tapa Gaccha in 1880 led a movement to restore orders of wandering monks, which brought about the near-extinction of the Yati institutions. Acharya Rajendrasuri restored the shramana organisation in the Tristutik Order.

 Murtipujaka Svetambara monastic orders
The monks of Murtipujaka sect are divided into six orders or Gaccha. These are:
 Kharatara Gaccha (1023 CE)
 Ancala Gaccha (1156 CE)
 Tristutik Gaccha (1193 CE)
 Tapa Gaccha (1228 CE)
 Vimala Gaccha (1495 CE)
 Parsvacandra Gaccha (1515 CE)

Kharatara Gaccha is one of Shvetambara . It is also called Vidhisangha (the Assembly) as they follow sacred texts literally. It was founded by Vardhamana Suri (1031). His teacher was a temple-dwelling monk. He rejected him because of not following texts.
His pupil, Jineshvara, got honorary title 'Kharatara' (Sharp witted or Fierce) because he defeated Suracharya, leader of Chaityavasis in public debate in 1023 at Anahilvada Patan. So the Gaccha got his title. Another tradition regards Jinadatta Suri (1075–1154) as a founder of Gaccha. Kharatara ascetics follow the sacred texts to the word. They follow basic Shvetambara canon and works of other Kharatara teachers.

Tristutik Gaccha was a Murtipujaka Svetambara Jain religious grouping preceding the founding of the Tapa Gaccha by Acharya Rajendrasuri. It was established in 1194. It was known as Agama Gaccha in ancient times. The Tristutik believed in devotion to the Tirthankaras alone in most rituals, although offerings to helper divinities were made during large ceremonies. The Tristutik Gaccha was reformed by Acharya Rajendrasuri.

Tapa Gaccha is the largest monastic order of Svetambara Jainism. It was founded by Acharya Jagat Chandrasuri in 1229. He was given the title of "Tapa" (i.e. the meditative one) by the ruler of Mewar. Vijayananda Suri was responsible for reviving the wandering orders among the Svetambara monks. As a result of this reform, most Svetambara Jain monks today belong to the Tapa Gaccha.

A major dispute was initiated by Lonka Shaha, who started a movement opposed to idol worship in 1476. Sthānakavāsī is a sect of Jainism founded by a merchant named Lavaji about 1653 CE that do not pray to any statue. The sect is essentially a reformation of the one founded on teachings of Lonka. Sthānakavāsīs reject all but thirty-two of the Śvētāmbara canon.

Terapanth is another reformist religious sect under Svetambara Jainism. It was founded by Acharya Bhikshu, also known as Swami Bhikanji Maharaj. Swami Bhikanji was formerly a Sthanakvasi saint and had initiation by Acharya Raghunatha. But he had differences with his Guru on several aspects of religious practices of Sthanakvasi ascetics. Hence he left the Sthanakvasi sect with the motto of correcting practise of Jain monks, eventually on 28 June 1760 at Kelwa, a small town in Udaipur district of Rajasthan state, Terapanth was founded by him. This sect is also non-idolatrous. As Acharya Bhikanaji laid stress on the thirteen religious principles, namely, five Mahavratas (great vows), five samitis (regulations) and three Guptis (controls or restraints), his sub-sect was known as the Tera-pantha (path of thirteen). In this connection, two other interpretations have been given for the use of the term Terapantha for the sub-sect. According to one account, it is mentioned that as there were only thirteen monks and thirteen laymen in the pantha when it was founded. Other account says, Tera derived from Tera which literally means "yours". Terapanth is organised under the direction of one Acharya. Terapanth had a succession of only eleven Acharyas from the founder Acharya Bhikanaji as the First Acharya to the present. Further, the Terapanth regularly observes a festival known as Maryada Mahotasava. This distinctive festival is celebrated every year on the seventh day of the bright half of the month of Magha. At present Mahasharman is the eleventh Acharya of Terapanth.

About the 18th century, the Śvētāmbara and Digambara traditions saw an emergence of separate Terapanthi movements. Śvētāmbara Terapanth was started by Acharya Bhikshu in 18th century. In Terapanth there is only one Acharya, which is a unique feature of it.

Others
Raj Bhakta Marg or Kavi Panth or Shrimadia are founded on teachings of Shrimad Rajchandra by his followers after his death in 1901 They combine Digambara and Shvetambara traditions. Former Sthanakavasi monk Kanji Swami established Kanji Panth in 1934, which is regarded to be a branch of Digambara Jainism. Akram Vignan Movement established by Dada Bhagwan draws inspiration from teachings of Rajchandra and other Jain scriptures though it is considered as a Jain-Vaishnava Hindu syncretistic movement. They do not term themselves as Jain.

Yapaniya was a Jain order in western Karnataka which is now extinct. The first inscription that mentions them by Mrigesavarman (AD 475–490) a Kadamba king of Palasika who donated for a Jain temple, and made a grant to the sects of Yapaniyas, Nirgranthas (identifiable as Digambaras), and the Kurchakas (not identified). The last inscription which mentioned the Yapaniyas was found in the Tuluva region southwest Karnataka, dated Saka 1316 (1394 CE). Yapanya rose to its dominance in second century CE and declined after their migration to Deccan merging with Digambara or Svetambara.

References

Citations

Sources